"I Feel Good All Over" is a 1987 single by Stephanie Mills. The single was her second number one on the Hot Black Singles chart and first number one in 1987. The single spent three weeks at the top spot. However, despite holding I Wanna Dance with Somebody (Who Loves Me), by Whitney Houston, a number-one pop single, off that top spot for the first two of those weeks, the single did not make the Hot 100.

In 1988 singer Patti LaBelle admitted that she had been a given chance at recording the song by the songwriters' Gabriel Hardeman and Annette Hardeman (who was a background singer for her at the time), but passed believing that it wasn't a "Patti" song.  "When I heard Ms. Thing (Mills) sing it and everything was right, I said 'Patti' and slapped myself...I blew that one."

Charts

References

1987 singles
Stephanie Mills songs
1987 songs
MCA Records singles
Song recordings produced by Nick Martinelli
Contemporary R&B ballads
Soul ballads
1980s ballads